Burt Street is a street located in Fremantle, Western Australia. It runs between Queen Victoria Street and East Street and rises up the prominent hill that lies to the south of Cantonment Hill.

The lower part of the street is the current location of the Army Museum of Western Australia which is based in the former Army Artillery Barracks. This section of Burt Street was in the late 19th century considered part of Skinner Street.

Burt Street is the northern boundary of a block of State Housing Commission land that formerly had three apartment complexes (named 'Keli', 'Buli', and 'Kerta') but as of 2018 these had all been demolished and the site was to undergo redevelopment into a "new affordable community that enriches the unique character of Fremantle" with 15% being reserved for public housing.

Notes

External links 
 

 
Streets in Fremantle